Vinnie B. Clark (1878–1971) was an educator and author who established and developed the Geography Department at the San Diego State University.

Early life
Vinnie B. Clark was born in 1878 in Mayville, Wisconsin, the daughter of Dr. Gilbert J. Clark and Mrs. Elva V. Martin.

She graduated from the University of Wisconsin; she studied at Oshkosh State Normal School and University of Wisconsin, Madison.

Career
She was an educator and author.

She moved to San Diego in 1914 and established and developed the Geography Department at the San Diego State University. She advocated the hiring of Alvena Storm.

She traveled extensively.

She is the author of Europe, a geographical reader (1925).

She was the member of American Association of University Women, Daughters of the American Revolution, Amphion Club, Pacific Geographic Society, Pi Gamma Mu.

She resigned in 1937.

Personal life
Vinnie B. Clark moved to California in 1914 and lived at New Palace Hotel, San Diego, California.

She died in 1971.

References

People from Mayville, Wisconsin
1878 births
1971 deaths
People from San Diego
University of Wisconsin–Madison alumni
San Diego State University faculty